Nurabad (also Romanized as Nūrābād) is a village in Sakhvid Rural District, Nir District, Taft County, Yazd Province, Iran. At the 2006 census, its population was 12, in 7 families.

References 

Populated places in Taft County